Kevin McLean (born 10 September 1942) is a former Australian rules footballer who played for Collingwood and Hawthorn in the Victorian Football League (VFL) during the 1960s.

McLean was used in the key positions by Collingwood, mostly at centre half back. He played as a centre half forward in the 1964 VFL Grand Final, which they lost to Melbourne. The former Alphington Amateur had kicked one of his two career goals in the Preliminary Final win the previous weekend. He finished his career with a two-season stint at Hawthorn.

References

Holmesby, Russell and Main, Jim (2007). The Encyclopedia of AFL Footballers. 7th ed. Melbourne: Bas Publishing.

1942 births
Living people
Collingwood Football Club players
Hawthorn Football Club players
Australian rules footballers from Victoria (Australia)